Raja The Great is a 2017 Indian Telugu-language action comedy film written and directed by Anil Ravipudi and produced by Dil Raju on Sri Venkateswara Creations banner. The film stars Ravi Teja as a visually impaired man, alongside Mehreen Pirzada and Raadhika. Vivan Bhatena (in his Telugu Debut), Rajendra Prasad, Prakash Raj and Sampath Raj play supporting roles with music composed by Sai Karthik. The film marks the debut of Teja's son Mahadhan as child actor.

The film began its production began in April 2017 with filming taking place in Hyderabad and Darjeeling. Released worldwide on 18 October 2017, the film received mixed reviews from critics and audience with praise towards the cast performances, action sequences and entertainment value but criticism for writing and uneven tone.

Plot
Lucky is a very protected and pampered daughter of SP Prakash. In one of his operations, Prakash encounters the brother of a powerful gangster named Devaraj, for which Lucky was one of the reasons. Enraged, Devaraj gets Prakash killed and also targets Lucky. Lucky runs away to Darjeeling and hides in her father's friend Prasad's house to evade an attempt on her life. Later, the police department looks out for a special team to provide security for Lucky. 

Meanwhile, Raja is a blind man, who is trained by his head constable mother Anantha Lakshmi, to use his disability to his advantage. Anantha Lakshmi's ambition is to make her son a police officer. She obliges IG Viswaraj to include her blind son in the mission. After a few incidents, he agrees to send him, but only to cook food for other officers. Raja, with his friend Bujji and three other officers, heads to Darjeeling. Raja meets Lucky and starts changing the depressed Lucky into making her have a happy mood with a few tricks. He also learns about Prasad's difficulties and solves their problems. Lucky comes out of her depressed state and starts celebrating her life with Raja's help. Meanwhile, Devaraj learns about Lucky's location and orders his goons to attack her. Knowing this, Viswaraj and his team decide to protect Lucky by sending her abroad.

Raja tells her not to run and instead fight back, but Viswaraj neglects him and takes Lucky away. Devaraj's goons attack Viswaraj and his team on the way and try to kill Lucky, but to everyone's surprise, Raja rescues them by defeating the goons. Lucky gains confidence in Raja, and she agrees to stay with him and fight back. Lucky and Raja go to her uncle's house in Madhura, but her uncles do not accept her for a brief period. Raja makes them realize their mistakes. On Lucky's birthday, she learns about her father's wish to educate poor girls by adopting them and makes her father's wish as her ambition.

Meanwhile, a cat and mouse game ensues where Raja defeats Devaraj's goons and gives a strong warning not to trouble Lucky again. Devaraj kidnaps Anantha Lakshmi and Lucky. However, Raja saves his mother and Lucky with his intelligence. Raja, while escaping with Lucky and Bujji from Devaraj's factory, gathers evidences against Devaraj. Viswaraj is granted a warrant against Devaraj. When the police arrive at Devaraj's house to arrest him, he injures Raja and insults him (that he is scared of facing him alone and all), which rises Anantha Lakshmi's anger and she challenges Devaraj to fight her son. Raja fights and defeats Devaraj, but he does not kill him. Viswaraj encounters Devaraj and involves Raja in future police operations.

Cast

Production 
Anil Ravipudi had the idea to make a film with visually impaired character as a lead as he was fascinated by the talents they have. Ravipudi however didn't want the film to be art film and wrote the script in a commercial format. Ravipudi approached Ram Pothineni and N. T. Rama Rao Jr. for the film but Ravi Teja was finalized. Mehreen Pirzada was cast opposite Teja.

Principal photography of the film began in April 2017 in Hyderabad. The production moved to Darjeeling later that month. 70% of the shoot was completed by July 2017.

Release
The film was released on 18 October 2017. The film was later dubbed and released in Tamil as Raja Raja Dhan in 2019 and the film was dubbed in Malayalam under the same title in 2021. The Hindi dubbed version was directly premiered on Goldmines TV channel on 3 July 2022.

Soundtrack

The music is composed by Sai Karthik and released on Aditya Music Company. Raja The Great (Title Song) was released online, for which Ravi Teja gave his voice.

Reception 
Karthik Keramulu writing for the Firstpost rated 2.5 of 5 and wrote: "Raja The Great is an okayish entertaining affair in the theatre. However, the minute one walks out of the movie house, there’d be nothing to pull from the bed of the two-and-a-half-hour comedy to laugh about." The Hindu's Sangeetha Devi stated: "Anil Ravipudi takes the mass route with a blind protagonist and the result is silly humour." The Indian Express critic Manoj Kumar R who rated 2 stars, opined: "You don't go to watch a Ravi Teja film, which is directed by Anil Ravipudi, expecting a Nayakan. It's only fair that we judge his latest offering, Raja The Great, by the standards of mindless entertainers."

Sequel 
Ravipudi confirmed the film's sequel in one of the interviews, stating: "There is a slight tease at the very end of the rolling titles hinting at the possibility of a sequel for the actioner. The sequel will definitely happen but I can’t tell you the exact schedule of the shooting, release, and other details at the moment."

References

External links
 

2017 films
2010s Telugu-language films
2017 action comedy films
2017 martial arts films
Indian action comedy films
Indian martial arts films
Films scored by Sai Karthik
Films about blind people in India
2010s vigilante films
Indian films about revenge
2017 masala films
Films directed by Anil Ravipudi
2017 comedy films
Sri Venkateswara Creations films